The 24th Virginia Cavalry Regiment was a cavalry regiment raised in Virginia for service in the Confederate States Army during the American Civil War. It fought mostly with the Army of Northern Virginia.

Virginia's 24th Cavalry Regiment was organized in June, 1864, by consolidating eight companies of the 42nd Battalion Virginia Cavalry and two companies of Dearing's Confederate Cavalry. This unit served in General Gary's Brigade, Army of Northern Virginia, and fought in various conflicts around Richmond. Later it was involved in the Appomattox Campaign and surrendered with 19 officers and 144 men. Its commanders were Colonel William T. Robins, Lieutenant Colonel Theophilus G. Barham, and Major John R. Robertson.

See also

List of Virginia Civil War units

References

Units and formations of the Confederate States Army from Virginia
1864 establishments in Virginia
Military units and formations established in 1864
1865 disestablishments in Virginia
Military units and formations disestablished in 1865